

National teams

Denmark women's national football team

UEFA Women's Euro 2017

Group stage

Knockout stage

2019 FIFA Women's World Cup qualification

2017 Algarve Cup

Group stage

Ranking of 3rd placed teams

3rd place match

Friendlies

Total results summary

Domestic results

Women's football

2016–17 Elitedivisionen

Main round

Championship round

Notes

References

External links
 Official website

Seasons in Danish football